George Ormsby may refer to:

 George Ormsby (bishop) (1843–1924), Anglican bishop
 George Ormsby (Gaelic footballer) (1913–1965), Irish Gaelic footballer
 George Ormsby (politician) (1916–2013), American plumber and political candidate from Pennsylvania

See also
 George Ormsby-Gore, 3rd Baron Harlech (1855–1938), British soldier and politician